The Ossipee Mountains are a small mountain range in the New England state of New Hampshire, United States. The remains of an ancient volcanic ring dike, they lie north of Lake Winnipesaukee, east of Squam Lake, and south of the Sandwich Range, the southernmost of the White Mountains.  Mount Shaw is their highest point.

Geology and physiography
The Ossipee Mountains are the remains of a 125 million year-old volcanic ring dike, the remnant of a Cretaceous stratovolcano of the later White Mountain igneous province. The complex is circular in plain view and has a diameter of 14 km.

Notable summits
 Bald Knob
 Bayle Mountain
 Big Ball Mountain
 Faraway Mountain
 Mount Flagg
 Larcom Mountain
 Nickerson Mountain
 Mount Roberts
 Sentinel Mountain
 Mount Shaw
 Turtleback Mountain
 Mount Whittier

See also
Castle in the Clouds - a large estate located on the western portion of the Ossipee Mountains.
Pawtuckaway State Park - a related ring dike in southern New Hampshire

References

External links
 3-D image of ring dike

Mountain ranges of New Hampshire
Volcanism of New Hampshire
Landforms of Carroll County, New Hampshire
Cretaceous magmatism
Cretaceous volcanoes
New Hampshire placenames of Native American origin